Yves-François-Marie-Aimé Urvoy (1900–1944) was a French army officer and historian whose work has focused on  French colonial holdings in Africa.

Background
Urvoy was born to a family of lower-middle class French-Algerian settlers on 20 January 1900 in Orléansville, Algeria.
Relocating to metropolitan France in 1906, the family settled in Paimpol.  Urvoy attended the Lycée General David d'Angers, and then École régionale des beaux-arts d'Angers, before undertaking a second art degree at the Central Academy and the St Louis school.  Urvoy trained at the Manufacture nationale de Sèvres from 1918 to 1920 but upon completion of his training, decided to instead pursue a career in the military.

Works
Petit atlas ethno-démographique du Soudan, entre Sénégal et Tchad- Larose (1942)
Les bassins du Niger : étude de géographie physique et de paléogéographie Larose (1942)
Histoire des populations du Soudan central colonie du Niger- Larose (1936) 
Renaître Essais avec François Perroux-Éditions de la Renaissance européenne (1943)
Le Syndicalisme base d'une organisation communautaire économique dans le monde de demain
La Révolution du XXe siècle et la France, Presses universitaires de France (1942)
Chronique d’Agadès

References

French male non-fiction writers
1900 births
1944 deaths
20th-century French historians
20th-century French male writers